There are 1274 scheduled monuments in the county of Cumbria, in North West England. These protected sites date from the Neolithic period and include barrows, stone circles, Roman forts, standing stones, 19th century industrial sites, abbeys, and ruined castles.
In the United Kingdom, the scheduling of monuments was first initiated to insure the preservation of "nationally important" archaeological sites or historic buildings. The protection given to scheduled monuments is given under the Ancient Monuments and Archaeological Areas Act 1979

Notable scheduled monuments in Cumbria

See also
Grade I listed buildings in Cumbria
List of scheduled monuments in the United Kingdom

References

Scheduled monuments in Cumbria